Turnbull may refer to:

People
See Turnbull (surname)
Malcolm Turnbull, former Prime Minister of Australia

Places
Turnbull High School in Bishopbriggs, Scotland
Turnbull National Wildlife Refuge, located near Spokane, Washington, USA
Turnbull railway station in Manitoba, Canada
Turnbull River, a river located on the West Coast of New Zealand's South Island
Turnbull School
Turnbull Stakes
Turnbull Thomson Park, Invercargill, NZ
Mount Turnbull, Antarctica (named after W.L. Turnbull, radio supervisor at Mawson Station in 1965)
Mount Turnbull, Arizona, USA
Mount Turnbull, British Columbia (Sonora Island), Canada

Other
Clan Turnbull, Scottish clan
Jack Turnbull Award, award given yearly to the top attackman in NCAA lacrosse